L'Orée-d'Écouves is a commune in the Orne department in north-western France. It was established on 1 January 2019 by merger of the former communes of Livaie (the seat), Fontenai-les-Louvets, Longuenoë and Saint-Didier-sous-Écouves.

See also
Communes of the Orne department

References

Communes of Orne
States and territories established in 2019